Ruins is a two-issue comic book miniseries, written by Warren Ellis with painted artwork by Terese Nielsen, her husband Cliff Nielsen, and Chris Moeller, who took over for the last 17 pages of the second issue.

The series, conceived by Ellis as a parody of the Marvels series by Kurt Busiek and Alex Ross, is set in a dystopian version of the Marvel Universe. Like Marvels, the comic features reporter Phil Sheldon as the main character and was published in prestige format, with fully painted artwork and acetate covers, further creating the impression that it is a more twisted companion piece.

In the Marvel Multiverse, the Earth of the Ruins universe is listed as Earth-9591.

Plot

Issue #1
Former Daily Bugle reporter Phil Sheldon explores a dystopian version of the Marvel Universe where in his own words "everything that can go wrong  go wrong". In this world, the myriad experiments and accidents which led to the creation of superheroes on Earth-616 have instead here resulted in horrible deformities and painful deaths. Sheldon tours the country, investigating the aftermath of these events and researching a book about the strange phenomena in order to prove that the world has taken a wrong turn somewhere.

In this reality, the Avengers are a radical secessionist rebel group from California rebelling against an oppressive United States government led by 'President X'. Sheldon witnesses the destruction of the last Avengers Quinjet, killing Captain America, Giant-Man, the Wasp, and the Man in the Iron Mask. He encounters a decaying Wolverine, whose flesh is slowly falling off due to the toxicity of his adamantium bone structure. Sheldon proceeds to a Kree internment camp in Nevada, situated on a nuclear test site, where the last survivors of a Kree invasion fleet are slowly dying of cancer. Sheldon interviews Captain Mar-Vell, one of the Kree prisoners, who tells him why their invasion failed: the Kree had encountered the Silver Surfer (who had gone mad and torn open his own chest in a futile attempt to experience respiration again) only to discover that the Power Cosmic emanating from the Surfer's body had been interfering with their scanners. This prevented the Kree fleet from detecting a nuclear barrage which subsequently destroyed 90 percent of the Kree warships. After his interview with Mar-Vell, Sheldon goes to Washington, D.C. where he meets government agent Nick Fury, who attacks and almost shoots him, insisting that he 'proved he was clean' and claiming that Captain America introduced him to cannibalism. They are interrupted by Jean Grey, a prostitute, who offers herself to the two men for $20. Fury shoots her dead and then kills himself. After his encounter with Fury, Sheldon visits Chicago, Illinois and interviews Rick Jones, a morphine addict living with fellow addict Marlo Chandler, who tells the story of when Bruce Banner saved him from a gamma radiation blast. The blast transformed Banner into a monstrous green mass of pulsating tumors. Leaving the apartment, Sheldon trips over the corpse of the Punisher in the snow. Sheldon begs on his knees to be allowed to show the world how this state of affairs came to pass.

Issue #2
Sheldon is traveling on a plane with Raven Darkholme, who has developed dissociative identity disorder. She has neglected to take her prescribed pills, resulting in her shapeshifting uncontrollably, which leads to her death. When the plane lands, government agents take her body away while a protest against President X's government is underway. An agent bumps into Max Eisenhardt, damaging a magnetic dampening device that he carries to nullify his powers, which causes all metal objects nearby to attach to him, killing him and several others. Later, Sheldon visits a special prison in Texas which houses many mutants, including Scott Summers, Katherine Pryde, Kurt Wagner and Pietro Maximoff, all of whom have been mutilated and deformed in efforts to control their powers while trying to escape. Sheldon is given a tour by the warden, Wilson Fisk, who says that the only reason Sheldon was allowed to see the prison was because President X knew Sheldon was dying and wanted to grant a dying man his wish. Sheldon visits a carnival where Johnny Blaze performs and commits suicide by setting his skull on fire. Sheldon interviews Ben Grimm, who describes the painful deaths of this world's counterparts of the Fantastic Four and Victor von Doom when their spaceship flew through a cloud of radiation: Grimm had refused to pilot the ship due to safety concerns, so Reed Richards hired von Doom instead. Sheldon decides to begin writing his book, which he will title Marvels. However, he discovers that he has run out of the medication he has been taking; he has been infected with a virus passed on to him by his former Daily Bugle co-worker Peter Parker, caused by an irradiated spider that Parker himself experimented on that resulted in a highly infectious rash all over his body. The virus overcomes Sheldon, and he dies. As he lies on the ground, ignored by the passersby, his notes scatter in the wind.

Fates of other characters
Throughout the story, there are breaks within scenes that briefly describe the lives of other would-be Marvels; such as a version of Dr. Donald Blake, a cult leader who believes he can channel the entity Thor through his body after becoming addicted to fly-agaric mushrooms. Thor's hammer is seen to be recovered at the site of the destroyed Quinjet at the start, hinting that the two are possibly different people. Warren Worthington III serves President X in exchange for keeping his mutant nature a secret. Bucky Barnes, Jack Munroe, and Victor Creed are part of a fascist cannibalistic militia from Oklahoma. Matt Murdock died as a child after a crashing truck caused radioactive material to strike him in the face. Doctor Strange, a founding member of the Avengers, is missing. Beaubier twins Jeanne-Marie and Jean-Paul are homeless and fused together by their elbows; Jeanne-Marie is unaware that her brother is dead. Amora is a porn star accused of killing her producer with "magic". Emma Frost owns the Church of the Next Generation, where she legally adopts the children of her followers and has them undergo surgery to unlock their "psychic abilities". Zelda DuBois is a circus performer who performs illegal acts with a python. Hawkeye is executed due to being a member of the Avengers. T'Challa is imprisoned due to his affiliation with the Black Panther Party. The Scarlet Witch (a former member of the Avengers) is the one who betrays the Avengers for government protection after turning in state's evidence against the team. Galactus, who is thought to have been a god by the media, is found dead with his floating corpse being identified near Mars.

Collected editions
In 2009, the series was collected into a single volume.

Notes

References

External links
Ruins at the Marvel Database Project
Warren Ellis’ not so Mighty World Of Marvel, Forbidden Planet International Blog Log, May 27, 2009

Cannibalism in fiction
Marvel Comics dimensions
Dystopian comics
Satirical comics